Mathieu Nicolas (born 11 February 1987) is a French rugby union player. His position is Wing and he currently plays for FC Grenoble in the Top 14. He began his career with Bourgoin before moving to Castres in 2009. He moved to FC Grenoble in the summer of 2012.

References

1987 births
Living people
French rugby union players
Sportspeople from Valence, Drôme
Castres Olympique players
Rugby union wings
CS Bourgoin-Jallieu players
FC Grenoble players